Power to the People is an album by jazz saxophonist Joe Henderson, released on Milestone in 1969. Featuring Henderson with trumpeter Mike Lawrence (on two tracks), pianist Herbie Hancock, bassist Ron Carter and drummer Jack DeJohnette. Hancock's electric piano and Carter's bass guitar are the first electric instruments to appear on a Henderson album.

Track listing
All compositions by Joe Henderson, except where noted.

"Black Narcissus" – 4:50
"Afro-Centric" – 7:00
"Opus One-Point-Five" (Ron Carter) – 4:56
"Isotope" – 4:53
"Power to the People" – 8:42
"Lazy Afternoon" (Moross, Latouche) – 4:33
"Foresight and Afterthought (An Impromptu Suite in Three Movements)" – 7:33

Recorded on May 23 (2, 5) and May 29 (all others), 1969.

Personnel
 Joe Henderson — tenor saxophone
 Mike Lawrence — trumpet (2, 5)
 Herbie Hancock — piano (3, 4, 6), fender rhodes (1, 2, 5)
 Ron Carter — bass (1, 3, 4, 6, 7),  electric bass (2, 5)
 Jack DeJohnette — drums

References

1969 albums
Joe Henderson albums
Milestone Records albums
Albums produced by Orrin Keepnews